Gurakuqi  is an Albanian surname. Notable people with the surname include: 

Karl Gurakuqi (1895–1971), Albanian linguist and folklorist
Luigj Gurakuqi (1879–1925), Albanian writer and politician

Albanian-language surnames